We Are The Pipettes is the debut album from the Pipettes and is named after the group's theme song. It was released on 17 July 2006 by Memphis Industries on CD, vinyl and digital download. The song "We Are the Pipettes" was featured in "Everything Changes", the first episode of the TV series Torchwood.

In 2007 the entire album was remixed by Greg Wells as part of their United States record deal with Cherrytree Records, and features two new tracks that are not included on the original release: "Dance and Boogie" and "Baby, Just Be Yourself". It was released, with a new album cover (inspired by Attack of the 50 Foot Woman), on 2 October in North America and 17 October in Asia.

The album did not include any liner notes, except in the Japanese version which included the lyrics in English and Japanese.

Formats and track listings
UK
"We Are the Pipettes" – 2:48
"Pull Shapes" – 2:58
"Why Did You Stay?" – 1:43
"Dirty Mind" – 2:43
"It Hurts to See You Dance So Well" – 1:53
"Judy" – 2:47
"A Winter's Sky" – 3:03
"Your Kisses Are Wasted on Me" – 2:11
"Tell Me What You Want" – 2:32
"Because It's Not Love (But It's Still a Feeling)" – 2:37
"Sex" – 2:38
"One Night Stand" – 1:40
"ABC" – 2:07
"I Love You" – 1:37
International bonus track
"Really That Bad" – 02:04

USA
All songs remixed by Greg Wells
"We Are the Pipettes" – 2:48
"Pull Shapes" – 2:58
"Why Did You Stay?" – 1:43
"Dirty Mind" – 2:43
"It Hurts to See You Dance So Well" – 2:09
"Judy" – 2:47
"A Winter's Sky" – 3:03
"Your Kisses Are Wasted on Me" – 2:11
"Tell Me What You Want" – 2:32
"Because It's Not Love (But It's Still a Feeling)" – 2:37
"Sex" – 2:38
"One Night Stand" – 1:40
"ABC" – 2:07
"I Love You" – 1:37
"Dance and Boogie" – 2:11
"Baby, Just Be Yourself" – 3:00

Bonus CD available with some US copies:
"Magician Man" – 4:20
"Pull Shapes" video

Charts

References

External links
 Official site 
 Pitchfork article on signing with Interscope/Cherrytree Records

2006 debut albums
The Pipettes albums